A Daughter of the Law is a 1921 American silent crime film directed by Jack Conway and starring Carmel Myers, John B. O'Brien and Fred Kohler.

Cast
 Carmel Myers as Nora Hayes 
 John B. O'Brien as Jim Garth 
 Fred Kohler as George Stacey 
 Jack Walters as Slim Dolan 
 Dick La Reno as Pata Marlowe 
 Charles Arling as Insp. Hayes 
 Joseph Bennett as Eddie Hayes

References

Bibliography
 James Robert Parish & Michael R. Pitts. Film directors: a guide to their American films. Scarecrow Press, 1974.

External links
 

1921 films
1921 crime films
1920s English-language films
American silent feature films
American crime films
Films directed by Jack Conway
American black-and-white films
Universal Pictures films
1920s American films